Adaptive partition schedulers are a relatively new type of partition scheduler, which in turn is a kind of scheduling algorithm, pioneered with the most recent version of the QNX operating system. Adaptive partitioning, or AP, allows the real-time system designer to request that a percentage of processing resources be reserved for a particular partition (group of threads and/or processes making up a subsystem).  The operating system's priority-driven pre-emptive scheduler will behave in the same way that a non-AP system would until the system is overloaded (i.e. system-wide there is more computation to perform than the processor is capable of sustaining over the long term).  During overload, the AP scheduler enforces hard limits on total run-time for the subsystems within a partition, as dictated by the allocated percentage of processor bandwidth for the particular partition.

If the system is not overloaded, a partition that is allocated (for example) 10% of the processor bandwidth, can, in fact, use more than 10%, as it will borrow from the spare budget of other partitions (but will be required to pay it back later).  This is very useful for the non real-time subsystems that experience variable load, since these subsystems can make use of spare budget from hard real-time partitions in order to make more forward progress than they would in a fixed partition scheduler such as ARINC-653 , but without impacting the hard real-time subsystems' deadlines.

QNX Neutrino 6.3.2 and newer versions have this feature.

External links
Adaptive Partitioning Scheduler page at QNX.com
"A Survey of Task Schedulers" for an overview of schedulers, including partition schedulers.

Processor scheduling algorithms